511 Zum Steeles is a bus rapid transit route in Brampton, Ontario, Canada. The final corridor outlined in Phase 1 started service on November 26, 2012.

The route runs from the Brampton Gateway Terminal at Steeles Avenue and Hurontario Street to Humber College North Campus at Finch Avenue West and Highway 27 in Toronto  with connections to the planned Line 6 Finch West line and various express bus services, via Bramalea GO Train Station. Though largely industrial through Brampton, Steeles Avenue sees bus service every six minutes on current route 11. This is the only planned corridor to operate almost entirely within Brampton city limits. In September 2015, limited service on 511 Zum Steeles was extended to Lisgar GO Station operating only on weekdays. Eventually, full service on the entire route were implemented.

The route was suspended past Chinguacousy Road in March 2021, after nine drivers tested positive for COVID-19. It was noted that the route led to a "large logistics business," in the midst of an outbreak. Shortly after, the outbreak was confirmed to be Amazon. Peel Public Health Medical Officer of Health Dr. Lawrence Loh denied there was a connection between the two outbreaks.

Stops

Italics indicates future stop.

References

Züm bus routes
2012 establishments in Ontario